The crested black tyrant (Knipolegus lophotes) is a species of bird in the family Tyrannidae.
It is found in Brazil, Uruguay and northeastern Paraguay.
Its natural habitats are dry savanna and pastureland. The Crested Black Tyrant can be described as glossy-black, slender and upright with red eyes and white patches on its lower body that shine upon flight. The bird mainly consumes insects and small fruits.

References

<ref>{{cite journal |last1=Willis |first1=Edwin |title=Similarity of A Tyrant-Flycatcher and a Silky-Flycatcher: Not all  Character Convergence is Competitive Mimicry |date=1976 |page=1 |pages=1 |url=https://sora.unm.edu/sites/default/files/journals/condor/v078n04/p0553-p0553.pdf |access-

crested black tyrant
Birds of Brazil
Birds of Uruguay
crested black tyrant
Taxonomy articles created by Polbot